The Kyabram District Football League (KDL) is an Australian rules football league in Victoria. It is made up of 15 teams; the most recent additions include Dookie United in 2018 and Shepparton East in 2019. The KDL is made up of smaller country town football clubs in the Goulburn Valley. The majority of these towns have a population base of around 1000 people, each of these clubs aims to field four football sides in the Senior, Reserve, Under 18 and Under 13 divisions of the KDFL as well as eight netball sides in A-Grade, B-Grade, C-Grade, C Reserve, 17 & Under, 15 & Under, 13 & Under and 11 & Under divisions,

The KDL season is made up of 18 rounds in the home and away season, with each side playing 16 games, at the conclusion of the home and away season, the top six teams in each division face off in the finals series. The top two teams in this series are assured a second chance at making the Grand Final, however the third, fourth, fifth and sixth placed teams have no such luxury and are eliminated after any loss, this system works to reward the teams who have performed better over the home and away season.

During the season, each club will play eight home games and eight away games, in finals however, venues are designated to different clubs on a cycle. For over a decade the Grand Final has been hosted by Goulburn Valley Football League ground, Mooroopna hosting on most occasions and Tatura being the venue in 2013.

History
The Kyabram District Football Association was formed in 1932, changing its name to Kyabram District Football League in 1960.

Current Clubs

Former Clubs
Ardmona  (1957-2021)
Tongala (1932-1945)
Wyuna (1932-1952)
Kyabram (1932-1958)
Corop (1936)
Camp 1 (1946)
Cooma (1949-1954)
Miepoll (1945-1952)
Congupna(1956-1961)
Yea (1986-1997) & (2006-2007)

Records
Highest Score
 371 – Lancaster 57.29.371 (v Ardmona 1.0.6) – 2018
Most goals in a game
 34 - Craig Whelan - Violet Town v Ardmona - 2012
Most goals in a season
 173 - Perry Meka - Ardmona - 1992
Most wins in a row
 35 - Lancaster 2001-2002
Most losses in a row
 41 - Ardmona 2015-2016, 2018
Most flags in a row
 4 - Shepparton East 1958-1961

Awards

Football Premierships

Best & Fairest Winners

1946- K.Dunstall (Girgarre)
1947- Bryan Tyndall (Undera)
1948- K.Betson (Kyabram Imperials)
1949- P.Humphrey (Kyabram Imperials)
1950- J.Brown (Girgarre)
1951- L.Pell (Wyuna)
1952- E.Wade (Lancaster)
1953- I.Perry (Cooma)
1954- L.Doolan (Girgarre)
1955- P.Fry (Merrigum)
1956- F.Salmon (Lancaster) & D.McKenna (Shepparton East)
1957- W.Roe (Congupna)
1958- I.Hughes (Miepoll)
1959- G.Arthur (Girgarre)
1960- J.Sellwood (Undera)
1961- K.James (Miepoll)
1962- J.Neal (Undera)
1963- R.Doolan (Girgarre)
1964- G.Cross (Murchison)
1965- R.Moore (Nagambie)
1966- A.Carson (Girgarre)
1967- P.Sleeth (Undera)
1968- C.Barnes (Ardmona)
1969- M.Varcoe (Girgarre) & N.Hosie (Tallygaroopna)
1970- K.Chapman (Merrigum)
1971- N.Langley (Girgarre)
1972- D.McKellar (Ardmona)
1973- P.Sleeth (Undera)
1974- M.Black (Nagambie) & P.Sleeth (Undera)
1975- B.Finnigan (Nagambie)
1976- K.Atkinson (Murchison)
1977- T.Gallagher (Nagambie)
1978- L.Casey (Girgarre)
1979- G.Saunders (Ardmona)
1980- C.Gundrill (Undera)
1981- N.Whittaker (Tallygaroopna)
1982- G.Wallis (Girgarre)
1983- W.Lee (Tallygaroopna)
1984- E.Shiels (Nagambie)
1985- M.Black (Nagambie)
1986- E.Shiels (Nagambie) & N.Whittaker (Tallygaroopna)
1987- M.Rijs (Murchison) & P.White (Merrigum)
1988- R.Aldous (Avenel)
1989- M.Power (Tallygaroopna)
1990- P.Cunningham (Yea)
1991- P.Thorpe (Avenel)
1992- E.Shiels (Nagambie)
1993- E.Shiels (Nagambie)
1994- R.Demarte (Lancaster)
1995- R.Martin (Yea)
1996- R.Martin (Yea)
1997- L.O'Brien (Undera)
1998- R.Aldous (Nagambie)
1999- R.Aldous (Nagambie)
2000- R.Aldous (Nagambie)
2001- A.Thomas (Lancaster)
2002- J.Waasdorp (Rushworth)
2003- D.Harrison (Stanhope)
2004- T. Sidebottom (Tallygaroopna)
2005- B. Lowe (Ardmona)
2006- A. Molisak (Tallygaroopna)
2007- M. Shiels (Nagambie)
2008- C. Eddy (Lancaster)& M. Young (Ardmona)
2009- P. Burnett (Lancaster)
2010- T. Snelson (Girgarre)
2011- S. Thompson (Lancaster)
2012- R. Lee (Violet Town)
2013- J. Pell (Merrigum)
2014- M. Shiels (Nagambie)
2015- D. Stirling (Avenel)
2016- K. Duncan (Avenel)
2017- S. Poole (Violet Town)

Leading Goal Kickers

1982- Peter Ewart 69 (Murchison) and 11 in finals
1988- Brett Barnes 84 (Nagambie)and 3 goals in finals
1997- Shane Loveless 111 (Ardmona) and 28 goals in finals

2014 Ladder

2015 Ladder

2016 Ladder

2017 Ladder

References

External links
Official Kyabram and District Football League Website

Australian rules football competitions in Victoria (Australia)
1932 establishments in Australia
Netball leagues in Victoria (Australia)